For service to the Fatherland Order is an order of the Azerbaijan Republic. The order was established on November 7, 2003.

Status
"For service to the Fatherland" Order of Azerbaijan Republic awards are given for the following services:

Loyalty to Azerbaijan Republic, performance of administrative duties with dignity and honesty
Productive activity, excellence and outstanding public services
Special contributions to construction of the national state
Special contributions in  the fields of science, education and health

The three classes of the Order are confessed sequentially.

The "For service to the Fatherland" Order is pinned to the left side of the chest. It follows any other orders and medals of Azerbaijan Republic and is in turn followed by Heydar Aliyev Order, Istiglal Order, Shah Ismail Order, Azerbaijani Flag Order, Shohrat Order, Sheref Order and Dostlug Order.

References

Orders, decorations, and medals of Azerbaijan
2003 establishments in Azerbaijan
Awards established in 2003